The 2016 Wind Energy Holding Bangkok Open was a professional tennis tournament played on hard courts. It was the first edition of the tournament which was part of the 2016 ATP Challenger Tour. It took place in Bangkok, Thailand between 29 August – 4 September 2016.

Singles main-draw entrants

Seeds 

 1 Rankings were as of August 22, 2016.

Other entrants 
The following players received wildcards into the singles main draw:
  Phassawit Burapharitta
  Wishaya Trongcharoenchaikul
  Jirat Navasirisomboon
  Kittipong Wachiramanowong

The following players received entry from the qualifying draw:
  Sergey Betov
  Connor Farren
  Gao Xin
  Sidharth Rawat

Champions

Singles 

  Blaž Kavčič def.  Go Soeda, 6–0, 1–0 ret.

Doubles 

  Wishaya Trongcharoenchaikul /  Kittipong Wachiramanowong def.  Sanchai Ratiwatana /  Sonchat Ratiwatana, 7–6(11–9), 6–3

References 

 
 ATP Challenger Tour
Tennis, ATP Challenger Tour, Wind Energy Holding Bangkok Open
Tennis, ATP Challenger Tour, Wind Energy Holding Bangkok Open

Tennis, ATP Challenger Tour, Wind Energy Holding Bangkok Open
Tennis, ATP Challenger Tour, Wind Energy Holding Bangkok Open